Oregon Route 414 (OR 414) is an Oregon state highway running from OR 86S and OR 413 in Halfway to OR 86 near Halfway. OR 414 is known as the Pine Creek Highway No. 414 (see Oregon highways and routes).

OR 414 was established in 2003 as part of Oregon's project to assign route numbers to highways that previously were not assigned, and, as of July 2017, was unsigned.

Route description 

OR 414 begins at an intersection with OR 86S and OR 413 in Halfway heads east to an intersection with OR 86 approximately 3/4 mile east of the city limits, where it ends.

History 

OR 414 was assigned to the Pine Creek Highway in 2003.

Major intersections

References 

 Oregon Department of Transportation, Descriptions of US and Oregon Routes, https://web.archive.org/web/20051102084300/http://www.oregon.gov/ODOT/HWY/TRAFFIC/TEOS_Publications/PDF/Descriptions_of_US_and_Oregon_Routes.pdf, page 31.

414
Transportation in Baker County, Oregon